Filya is a rural locality (a selo) in Magaramkentsky District, Republic of Dagestan, Russia. The population was 2,402 as of 2010. There are 8 streets.

Geography 
Filya is located 22 km northeast of Magaramkent (the district's administrative centre) by road, on the left bank of the Samur River. Khodzha-Azmalyar and Kabir-Kazmalyar are the nearest rural localities.

Nationalities 
Lezgins live there.

References 

Rural localities in Magaramkentsky District